Ansley Constance is a member of the National Assembly of Seychelles. A teacher by profession, he is a member of the Seychelles People's Progressive Front, and has been elected to the Assembly twice.

References
Member page on Assembly website

Year of birth missing (living people)
Living people
Members of the National Assembly (Seychelles)
People from Roche Caiman
People from Plaisance, Seychelles
United Seychelles Party politicians